The  1960 Concepción earthquakes were a succession of three destructive earthquakes that happened between 21 and 22 May 1960. They formed part of the foreshock sequence for the 1960 Valdivia earthquake, the largest recorded earthquake in history.

The first was on May 21 at 06:02 UTC-4. Its epicenter was near Cañete, Bío Bío Region, Chile, and its magnitude was 8.1  or 8.3MW and 7.3 or 7.5MS. This earthquake, which lasted 35 seconds, destroyed a third of the buildings in the city of Concepción.

The earthquake effectively interrupted and ended Lota's coal miners march on Concepción where they demanded higher salaries.

The second happened on May 22 at 06:30 UTC-4. Its epicenter was in the Nahuelbuta National Park, Araucanía Region, Chile, and its magnitude was 7.1 Mw. It was followed by a 6.8 Mw earthquake at 06:32 UTC-4.

The third happened the same day at 14:56 UTC-4. Its epicenter was near Purén, Araucanía Region, Chile and its magnitude was 7.8 MS or 7.8 Mw. This earthquake happened 15 minutes before the 1960 Valdivia earthquake.

See also 
1960 Valdivia earthquake
List of earthquakes in 1960
List of earthquakes in Chile

References

External links 

Concepcion earthquake
Concepcion earthquake
History of Biobío Region
Concepción, Chile
May 1960 events in South America
Presidency of Jorge Alessandri